The 2015 NCAA Division I men's soccer season was the 57th season of NCAA championship men's college soccer. The regular season began on August 28 and continues into November 2015. The season culminated with the 2015 NCAA Division I Men's Soccer Championship in December 2015.   There were 206 teams in men's Division I competition. The defending champions were Virginia who defeated UCLA  0–0 (4–2 PKs) to win its seventh NCAA soccer title. The season concluded with Stanford defeating Clemson 4–0 to win its first championship.

Changes from 2014

Coaching changes

New programs 
 The University of Texas Rio Grande Valley (UTRGV), created for the 2015–16 school year with the merger of the University of Texas–Pan American (UTPA) and University of Texas at Brownsville (UTB), added the sport to the Division I athletic program it inherited from UTPA. Although UTB had a highly successful NAIA men's soccer team, the UTRGV program was created essentially from scratch, with an entirely new coaching staff and only two UTB players remaining in the UTRGV program. UTRGV also inherited UTPA's membership in the Western Athletic Conference.

Discontinued programs 

None.

Conference realignment 

NJIT, previously the only Division I basketball independent, played the 2014 season as a single-sport member of the Sun Belt Conference. Although NJIT replaced Northern Kentucky in the Atlantic Sun Conference (A-Sun) in July 2015, the men's soccer team remained in the Sun Belt for the 2015 season due to contractual commitments to that league. NJIT men's soccer will join the A-Sun in 2016.

Additionally, the 2015 season was the last for Coastal Carolina in the Big South Conference. The Chanticleers will join the Sun Belt Conference on July 1, 2016, in all sports except football, with that team joining the conference a year later. The arrival of Coastal Carolina will maintain the Sun Belt at six men's soccer members, preserving the league's automatic NCAA tournament berth.

Season overview

Pre-season polls 
Several American soccer outlets posted their own preseason top 25 rankings of what were believed to be the strongest men's collegiate soccer teams entering 2015.

Regular season

#1

Standings

Major upsets 

In this list, a "major upset" is defined as a game won by a team ranked 10 or more spots lower or an unranked team that defeats a team ranked #15 or higher.

Statistics

Individuals

Last update on December 14, 2015.Last update on December 14, 2015.

Last update on December 14, 2015Last update on December 14, 2015

Last update on December 14, 2015Last update on December 14, 2015

Teams
Last update on December 14, 2015Last update on December 14, 2015

Last update on December 14, 2015

All statistics are through the games of December 13, 2015Last update on December 14, 2015

Attendances

Source:

See also 
 College soccer
 List of NCAA Division I men's soccer programs
 2015 in American soccer
 2015 NCAA Division I Men's Soccer Championship

References 

 
NCAA